Nahid Shahmehri is a professor of Computer Science at Linköping University and also Senior Member of IEEE, specializing in computer and network security issues.

References

External links

Year of birth missing (living people)
Living people
American expatriate academics
Academic staff of Linköping University